The Premio Mario Zanfi, also known as the Franz Liszt Competition in Parma, is an international piano competition held at the Parma Conservatory since 1981. Past jurors include Lazar Berman, Louis Kentner, Jenő Jandó, Leslie Howard, Azio Corghi, Gleb Axelrod and Boris Petrushansky. It is a member of the Alink-Argerich Foundation.

Past winners have been:

References

Piano competitions
Music competitions in Italy